Bista is a family name of people of Nepal belonging to Khas people group under the caste Chhetri, sub-groups of Kshatriya varna and the Bahun caste of Brahmin varna. They are Hindu with a local Masto deity. They speak Nepali language as mother tongue. In India, Bista/Bistas are spelled as Bisht/Bishts or Bist/Bists and are titled as Rajputs. They are mostly found in Indian state of Uttarakhand. Bista is also a surname belonging to the Brahmins of the Kumain Bahun subcaste.

Naming and Status

Bista is literally translated as Baron or landholder.  For example; Chauhan in Eastern Nepal were referred as Bista in an explanation of assault of a Chauhan man by a Dalit man where governmental orders of capital punishment was given to the Dalit man on Poush Badi 12, 1882 V.S. (1826 A.D.) on the grounds of assaulting a high caste citizen. The excerpts from the royal orders to Bichari (Judge) Shivanidhi Padhya and Bichari (Judge) Parath Khadka on Poush Badi 12, 1882 V.S.:

Notable people with surname Bista 
Anjan Bista, Nepalese footballer
Bikash Bista, Nepalese academician
Deepak Bista, taekwondo gold medalist
Dor Bahadur Bista, Nepalese anthropologist
Gokarna Bista, Nepalese politician
Kirti Nidhi Bista, former PM of Nepal
Om Bikram Bista, Nepali pop singer
Raju Bista, member of Indian parliament from Darjeeling.
Ranjan Bista , Nepalese footballer

Notable people with title Bista
Jigme Dorje Palbar Bista, Former Titular King of Mustang

References

Books

Surnames of Nepalese origin
Nepali-language surnames
Khas people
Brahmin communities of Nepal
Hindu communities